Anastrangalia is a genus of beetle in the family Cerambycidae, containing the following species:

Anastrangalia dissimilis (Casey, 1891)
Anastrangalia dubia (Scopoli, 1763)
Anastrangalia haldemani (Casey, 1891)
Anastrangalia kasaharai (Makihara, 2002)
Anastrangalia laetifica (LeConte, 1859)
Anastrangalia montana (Mulsant & Rey, 1863)
Anastrangalia renardi (Gebler, 1848)
Anastrangalia reyi (Heyden, 1889)
Anastrangalia rubriola (Bates, 1878)
Anastrangalia sanguinea (LeConte, 1859)
Anastrangalia sanguinolenta (Linnaeus, 1761)
Anastrangalia scotodes (Bates, 1873)

References

Lepturinae